Saint Julian Sabas (or Julian the Ascetic; died 377 AD) was a hermit who spent most of his life in deserted parts of Syria, but left his cell for a short period to denounce Arianism.
His feast day is 14 January or 18 October in the Roman Church.

Roman Martyrology

The Roman Martyrology includes:

Monks of Ramsgate account

The monks of St Augustine's Abbey, Ramsgate, wrote in their Book of Saints (1921),

Butler's account

The hagiographer Alban Butler ( 1710–1773) wrote in his Lives of the Primitive Fathers, Martyrs, and Other Principal Saints, under October 18,

Baring-Gould's account

Sabine Baring-Gould wrote in his Lives of the Saints (1872),

Notes

Sources

 
 
 
 

Greek saints of the Eastern Orthodox Church
Byzantine hermits
377 deaths